James Pringle may refer to:

 Sir James Pringle, 4th Baronet (1726–1809), Scottish politician, Member of Parliament (MP) for Berwickshire 1761–79
 James Pringle (Northern Ireland politician) (1874–1935), barrister and Unionist MP for Fermanagh & Tyrone 1924–29
 James Hogarth Pringle (1863–1941), Australian-born surgeon in Glasgow, Scotland, famous for the development of the Pringle manoeuvre
 James E. Pringle (born 1949), British astrophysicist, professor of theoretical astronomy at the University of Cambridge
 James Scott Pringle (born 1937), Canadian botanist
 James Pringle (Provost) (1822–1886), Provost of Leith
 James R. Pringle (1782–1840), intendant (mayor) of Charleston, South Carolina